James, Jim, or Jimmy Nicholson may refer to:
James Nicholson (naval officer) (1737–1804), United States navy captain
James W. Nicholson (1821–1887), United States Navy admiral
James Nicholson (poet) (1822–1897), Scottish labouring-class poet
James Nicholson (Canadian politician) (1827–1905), politician in Prince Edward Island, Canada
James H. Nicholson (1916–1972), film producer
James Mervyn Nicholson, better known as Skonk Nicholson (1917–2011), South African rugby union coach
James Brindley Nicolson (1917–1945), British aviator and recipient of the Victoria Cross
James Nicholson (Canadian businessman), founder of the seed company Nicholson and Brock and patron of the Dictionary of Canadian Biography
Jim Nicholson (Secretary of Veterans Affairs) (born 1938), former United States Secretary of Veterans Affairs, and chairman of the Republican National Committee
Jimmy Nicholson (Northern Irish footballer) (born 1943), Irish footballer
Jimmy Nicholson (Scottish footballer) (born 1957), Scottish footballer
Jim Nicholson (Northern Ireland politician) (born 1945), Ulster Conservative and Unionist politician
Jim Nicholson (offensive lineman) (born 1949), retired American football player
Jim Nicholson (American football coach) (died 1983), American football player and coach
Harold James Nicholson (born 1950), former CIA officer twice convicted of espionage
James B. Nicholson, 1996 U.S. Senate primary candidate against Ronna Romney
James Nicholson (American businessman) (born 1966), convicted of defrauding numerous investors of millions

See also
James Nicolson (disambiguation)